The I-52 is a mine-laying vehicle designed in Ukraine by the Kriukiv Machine-building Works.

Purpose and composition
The I-52 Mine-laying vehicle is intended for distant antipersonnel and Anti-tank mine laying. The vehicle ensures mine-laying in all weather and climatic conditions, during daylight or at night, in any temperature and on hilly terrain.
The I-52 can also deploy mines while moving.

The vehicle includes multipurpose chassis MT-LBU and equipment which consists of:
 mine-laying control panel placed in control compartment;
 container unit for transportation and firing of mines from clusters;
 container unit lifting mechanism from traveling position to fire position;
 container adjusting mechanism;
 container unit traversing mechanism.

References

Armoured fighting vehicles of Ukraine